Chol Tong Mayay Jang is a South Sudanese politician. He has served as governor of Lakes state since 28 May 2010, winning with 228,080 votes, representing 86.54% of total votes.

References

South Sudanese politicians
South Sudanese state governors
Living people
People from Lakes (state)
Year of birth missing (living people)